Douglas Lloyd Ingle (born September 9, 1945) is an American musician, best known as the founder and former organist, primary composer, and lead vocalist for the band Iron Butterfly. Ingle wrote the band's iconic song "In-A-Gadda-Da-Vida", which was first released in 1968. He is the last surviving original band member and the last of the classic 1967–69 lineup.

Ingle had a short stint with the pop group Stark Naked and the Car Thieves in the early 1970s after he left Iron Butterfly.

Early life and career
Ingle was born in Omaha, Nebraska. His father Lloyd, a church organist, introduced him to music at an early age. Ingle moved from his native Nebraska within three months of his birth to the Rocky Mountains and later the family moved to San Diego.

Ingle founded Iron Butterfly in San Diego in 1966, remaining with the group when they relocated to Los Angeles later that year, and became part of the group's classic lineup, featuring Ingle, drummer Ron Bushy, guitarist Erik Brann and bassist Lee Dorman. His work is featured on the Iron Butterfly albums Heavy (1968), In-A-Gadda-Da-Vida (1968), Ball (1969) and Metamorphosis (1970). He also authored the band's biggest hit, also called "In-A-Gadda-Da-Vida". He co-authored their remaining three hits ("Soul Experience", "In the Time of Our Lives", and "Easy Rider") with other members of the group.

When Iron Butterfly broke up in 1971, Ingle toured occasionally with his former band members, but was not involved with either of Iron Butterfly's later two albums, Scorching Beauty and Sun and Steel, both from 1975. With the deaths of Brann, Dorman and Bushy in 2003, 2012 and 2021, respectively, Ingle is the only surviving member of the 1967–1969 lineup of Iron Butterfly.

Between 1974 and 1978, Ingle managed a recreational vehicle park in the Los Angeles National Forest. He spent time painting houses in Oregon, Washington and California.

References

1945 births
Living people
American male singers
American rock keyboardists
American male organists
American rock singers
Iron Butterfly members
Musicians from Omaha, Nebraska
20th-century American keyboardists
20th-century American male musicians
21st-century American keyboardists
21st-century American musicians
21st-century organists
21st-century American male musicians
American organists